Class 803 may refer to:

British Rail Class 803
FS Class ALe 803
ICE 1#Service Car (Class 803)